John Patrick Farrell (22 May 1968 – 3 November 2010) was an American poet and composer.

Early life
J.P. Farrell was born in Glen Cove, New York and pursued study of music from an early age. He composed music and performed in numerous ensembles in Long Island. Farrell entered SUNY Fredonia School of Music in 1986 as a Music Theory and Film major.  He later transferred to SUNY Geneseo to pursue music composition studies with James Willey. Upon his graduation, Farrell remained semi-active in the New York Jazz scene as a bassist; performing with pianist Hyperion Knight. J.P. Farrell was a member of the Songwriters Guild of America and the American Federation of Musicians.

Literary career
Farrell moved to Minneapolis in 1994 and worked with the St. Paul Chamber Orchestra and Minnesota Opera. He enrolled at the University of Minnesota in the MFA program for Creative Writing in 1999. It was there that he studied poetry with Ray Gonzalez and won several awards for his poetry including an ArtsWords Award in 2002,
and has been published in numerous academic poetry journals.  He was an active poet and music teacher in Boerne, Texas. In January 2010, Farrell launched the Atonal Poetry Review, published by Atonal Press.

His poem "Had Schumann Lived" was published in di-vêrse´-city (AIPF; 2010). He also served as Executive Director of the Guadalupe Valley Poetry Celebration.

References

External links
Austin International Poetry Festival (2009)
Atonal Poetry Review

1968 births
American male poets
American jazz composers
American male jazz composers
Writers from Glen Cove, New York
University of Minnesota alumni
2010 deaths
Place of death missing
Avant-garde jazz double-bassists
20th-century American poets
20th-century American male writers
People from Boerne, Texas
Jazz musicians from New York (state)
Jazz musicians from Texas